The 2017 F4 British Championship was a multi-event, Formula 4 open-wheel single seater motor racing championship held across United Kingdom. The championship featured a mix of professional motor racing teams and privately funded drivers, competing in Formula 4 cars that conformed to the technical regulations for the championship. This, the third season, following on from the British Formula Ford Championship, was the third year that the cars conformed to the FIA's Formula 4 regulations. Part of the TOCA tour, it formed part of the extensive program of support categories built up around the BTCC centrepiece.

The season commenced on 1 April at Brands Hatch – on the circuit's Indy configuration – and concluded on 1 October at the same venue, using the Grand Prix circuit, after thirty races held at ten meetings, all in the support of the 2017 British Touring Car Championship. The championship featured Ford F4 Challenge Cup for the first time for the drivers with low budgets. The Challenge Cup Required competitors to enter 7 of the weekends of the championship, which had to include the rounds at Knockhill Racing Circuit and the finale at Brands Hatch.

The season was marred by an incident involving Billy Monger, who had both his lower legs amputated after crashing into Patrik Pasma during the third race at the Donington Park round.

Teams and drivers
All teams were British-registered.

Race calendar and results
The calendar was announced on  16 June 2016.

Championship standings

Points were awarded as follows:

Drivers' standings

 Half points awarded in Race 3 at Donington Park and Race 2 at Oulton Park due to less than 75% of the race being completed. Race 3 at Oulton Park was cancelled due to barrier damage and the race was postponed to the 2nd race in Round 7 at Knockhill Racing Circuit.

Ford F4 Challenge Cup

 Half points awarded in Race 3 at Donington Park and Race 2 at Oulton Park due to less than 75% of the race being completed.
 Race 3 at Oulton Park was cancelled due to barrier damage and the race was postponed to Round 7 at Knockhill Racing Circuit.

Teams Cup
Each team nominated two drivers to score points before every round. All non-nominated drivers were ignored.

References

External links
 

F4 British Championship seasons
British F4
F4 British Championship
British F4